Josephine Joseph Lagu is a South Sudanese politician and the Minister of Agriculture and Food Security as of 2022.

Political affiliation (party) 
Hon Josephine Lagu is a member of the People's Democratic Movement founded by Dr. Hakim Darious but was elected in 2019 to the position of chairperson of the South Sudan Opposition Alliance, which comprises various opposition parties.

Controversy 
Josephine Joseph Lagu was accused of involvement in the embezzlement of funds in 2009. However, on Friday, April 30th, 2010, the High Court in Juba cleared Josephine of all the charges for lack of proof.

References 

Living people
Year of birth missing (living people)